Kalvacherla is a village of Ramagiri mandal located in the Peddapalli district of the state of Telangana in India.

Demographics
Kalvacherla's regional language is Telugu. The total population of Kalvacherla in 2011 was 4,558, living in a total of 1,064 homes.

Transportation
Ramagundam Godavarikhani is the nearest city to Kalvacherla which 18 kilometres away. The closest bus stations are Godavarikhani and Manthani TSRTC stations. TSRTC Godavarikhani, Manthani runs many number of buses from major cities which pass through Kalvacherla. There is no railway station near to Kalvacherla in less than 10 km. How ever there are railway Stations from Near By  Peddapalli, Ramagundam railway stations within 20 to 30 km from this village.

Government
Ganta Padma was elected as sarpanch in the most recent election of January 2019.

Tourism

Ramagiri Fort or Ramgiri Khilla in the Peddapalli District of Telangana, is a picturesque hilltop fort. It has a view of the merging of the rivers Manair and Godavari river. There is an abundance of ayurvedic herbs and a large variety of flora and fauna.

Sabbitham Waterfalls,  Kalvacherla to Sabbitham waterfalls nearby (10 km). It is located in Sabbitham Village and District in fact after changing it is in Peddapalli District. It is a natural waterfall very well located place in trees. It has become popular from few years. It is not seen throughout the year it has very good flow of water in rainy season spring and winter.

Education
JNTUH College of Engineering Manthani, near Centenary Colony, Peddapalli district
Horticulture polytechnic college:CNC
Pragathi Degree College, Kalvacherla
Pragathi Jr College, Kalvacherla
Zilla Parishad High School, Kalvacherla
Pragathi High School, Kalvacherla
Vani Secondary School, Centenary colony
Hill Fort High School, Centenary colony

References

http://wikimapia.org/1346039/Kalvacherla-Village
http://manamanthani.com/

External links

Villages in Peddapalli district